Eric Edwin Sweeney (3 October 1903 – October 1968) was an English footballer. His regular position was as a forward. He was born in Birkenhead, Merseyside. He played for Charlton Athletic and Manchester United.

External links
MUFCInfo.com profile

1903 births
1968 deaths
English footballers
Charlton Athletic F.C. players
Manchester United F.C. players
Association football forwards